The Louisville metropolitan area is the 43rd largest metropolitan statistical area (MSA) in the United States. It had a population of 1,395,855 in 2020 according to the latest official census, and its principal city is Louisville, Kentucky.

The metropolitan area was originally formed by the United States Census Bureau in 1950 and consisted of the Kentucky county of Jefferson and the Indiana counties of Clark and Floyd. As surrounding counties saw an increase in their population densities and the number of their residents employed within Jefferson County, they met Census criteria to be added to the MSA. Jefferson County, Kentucky, plus eleven outlying countiesseven in Kentucky and four in Southern Indianaare now a part of this MSA. Two other counties, one each in Kentucky and Indiana, were part of the MSA in the 2000 and 2010 U.S. Censuses, but were spun off by the Census Bureau into their own Micropolitan Statistical Areas in 2013 and 2018 respectively. 

The formal name given to the area by the Census Bureau is the Louisville–Jefferson County, Kentucky–Indiana, metropolitan statistical area, though it is regularly referred to as Kentuckiana. It is now the primary MSA of the Louisville/Jefferson County–Elizabethtown–Bardstown, KY-IN Combined Statistical Area, created by the United States Bureau of the Census in 2000 and recently redefined in 2018.  The combined statistical area (CSA) adds the counties of Hardin County, Kentucky, LaRue County, Kentucky, Jefferson County, Indiana, and Nelson County, Kentucky and comprises the Louisville–Jefferson County MSA, the Elizabethtown–Fort Knox, Kentucky, MSA, the Bardstown, Kentucky, micropolitan statistical area and the Scottsburg, Indiana micropolitan statistical area.  In 2020, the Census Bureau measured the combined statistical area's population at 1,601,309.

Definitions
, the U.S. Office of Management and Budget defines the Louisville–Jefferson County MSA as including Bullitt, Henry, Jefferson, Meade, Oldham, Shelby, and Trimble Counties in Kentucky and Clark, Floyd, Harrison, and Washington Counties in Indiana. The larger Louisville–Jefferson County–Elizabethtown–Bardstown CSA adds two other statistical areas in Kentucky and one in Indiana:
 The Elizabethtown–Fort Knox, Kentucky, MSA, consisting of Hardin and LaRue Counties.
 The Bardstown, Kentucky, micropolitan statistical area, consisting of Nelson County.
 The Scottsburg, Indiana, micropolitan statistical area, consisting of that state's Scott County.

Counties
Louisville–Jefferson County MSA
 Bullitt County, Kentucky (80,246)
 Clark County, Indiana (116,973)
 Floyd County, Indiana (77,071)
 Harrison County, Indiana (39,898)
 Henry County, Kentucky (16,006)
 Jefferson County, Kentucky (771,158)
 Oldham County, Kentucky (66,415)
 Shelby County, Kentucky (47,421)
 Spencer County, Kentucky (18,507)
 Trimble County, Kentucky (8,561)
 Washington County, Indiana (27,827)

Elizabethtown–Fort Knox, Kentucky MSA
 Hardin County, Kentucky (108,071)
 Meade County, Kentucky (28,154)
 LaRue County, Kentucky (14,205)

Bardstown, Kentucky µSA
 Nelson County, Kentucky (45,640)

Scottsburg, Indiana µSA
 Scott County, Indiana (23,870)

Municipalities
Principal city
 Louisville, Kentucky

In 2003, the Jefferson County government merged with that of its largest city and county seat, Louisville, forming a new entity, the Louisville–Jefferson County Metro Government (official long form) or Louisville Metro (official short form). All small cities within Jefferson County became part of the new Louisville Metro government while retaining their city governments. For statistical and ranking purposes, the United States Census Bureau uses the statistical entity Louisville–Jefferson County metro government (balance), Kentucky, to represent the portion of the consolidated city-county of Louisville–Jefferson County that does not include any of the 83 separate incorporated places (municipalities) located within the city and county.

Louisville Metro (771,158) 
Louisville–Jefferson County (balance) (621,349)

Municipalities with more than 25,000 people
 Jeffersontown, Kentucky*
 Jeffersonville, Indiana
 New Albany, Indiana

Municipalities with 10,000 to 25,000 people
 Clarksville, Indiana
 Lyndon, Kentucky*
 Mount Washington, Kentucky
 St. Matthews, Kentucky*
 Shelbyville, Kentucky
 Shepherdsville, Kentucky
 Shively, Kentucky*

Municipalities with less than 10,000 people

 Anchorage*
 Audubon Park*
 Bancroft*
 Barbourmeade*
 Beechwood Village*
 Bellemeade*
 Bellewood*
 Blue Ridge Manor*
 Borden
 Brandenburg
 Briarwood*
 Broeck Pointe*
 Brownsboro Farm*
 Brownsboro Village*
 Cambridge*
 Campbellsburg
 Charlestown
 Clarksville
 Coldstream*
 Corydon
 Crandall
 Creekside*
 Crestwood
 Crossgate*
 Douglass Hills*
 Druid Hills*
 Ekron
 Elizabeth
 Eminence
 Fincastle*
 Forest Hills*
 Fox Chase
 Fredericksburg
 Georgetown
 Glenview Hills*
 Glenview Manor*
 Glenview*
 Goose Creek*
 Goshen
 Graymoor-Devondale*
 Green Spring*
 Greenville
 Hardinsburg
 Hebron Estates
 Heritage Creek*
 Hickory Hill*
 Hills and Dales*
 Hillview
 Hollow Creek*
 Hollyvilla*
 Houston Acres*
 Hunters Hollow
 Hurstbourne Acres*
 Hurstbourne*
 Indian Hills*
 Kingsley*
 La Grange
 Laconia
 Lanesville
 Langdon Place*
 Lebanon Junction
 Lincolnshire*
 Little York
 Livonia
 Lynnview*
 Manor Creek*
 Maryhill Estates*
 Mauckport
 Meadow Vale*
 Meadowbrook Farm*
 Meadowview Estates*
 Middletown*
 Milltown
 Mockingbird Valley*
 Moorland*
 Muldraugh
 Murray Hill*
 New Amsterdam
 New Castle
 New Middletown
 New Pekin
 Norbourne Estates*
 Northfield*
 Norwood*
 Old Brownsboro Place*
 Orchard Grass Hills
 Palmyra
 Parkway Village*
 Pewee Valley
 Pioneer Village
 Plantation*
 Pleasureville
 Poplar Hills*
 Prospect*‡
 Richlawn*
 River Bluff
 Riverwood*
 Rolling Fields*
 Rolling Hills*
 Saltillo
 Sellersburg
 Seneca Gardens*
 Simpsonville
 Smithfield
 South Park View*
 Spring Mill*
 Spring Valley*
 St. Regis Park*
 Strathmoor Manor*
 Strathmoor Village*
 Sycamore*
 Taylorsville
 Ten Broeck*
 Thornhill*
 Utica
 Vine Grove
 Watterson Park*
 Wellington*
 West Buechel*
 Westwood*
 Wildwood*
 Windy Hills*
 Woodland Hills*
 Woodlawn Park*
 Worthington Hills*

*Part of Louisville Metro
‡Prospect lies in both Jefferson and Oldham Counties. The portion within Jefferson County is part of Louisville Metro.

Historical statistics

Metropolitan statistical area

Notes
 Populations are based upon published estimates by the United States Bureau of the Census.

Combined statistical area

Notes
 Populations are based upon published estimates by the United States Bureau of the Census.

See also
 Geography of Louisville, Kentucky
 Table of United States Combined Statistical Areas

Notes

References

External links
 
 
 
 
 About Metropolitan and Micropolitan Statistical Areas
 

 
Metropolitan areas of Kentucky
Geography of Louisville, Kentucky
Regions of Kentucky